Anianou (also spelled Agnianou) is a town in east-central Ivory Coast. It is a sub-prefecture of Prikro Department in Iffou Region, Lacs District. The border with Zanzan District is two kilometres east of the town.

Anianou was a commune until March 2012, when it became one of 1126 communes nationwide that were abolished.

In 2014, the population of the sub-prefecture of Anianou was 5,814.

Villages
The 8 villages of the sub-prefecture of Anianou and their population in 2014 are:
 Affounvassou (354)
 Akorablékro (220)
 Anianou (1 776)
 Attoumabo (602)
 Koffikpinkro (344)
 Kotobo (1 433)
 N'zuéfoufoué (486)
 Pédéoua (599)

References

Sub-prefectures of Iffou
Former communes of Ivory Coast